The London Charity Cup was one of the London Football Association's cup competitions.

History 

The London FA previously ran three senior cup competitions, the London Challenge Cup, the London Senior Cup (known also as the London Senior Amateur Cup) and the London Charity Cup. The only time a club reached the final of all three competitions in the same season was in 1959–60. Tooting & Mitcham won the London Senior Cup after defeating Bromley 5–0 in the final played at The Den (home of Millwall). Tooting & Mitcham were losing finalists in the other two competitions after being beaten 2–1 by Barnet in the final of the London Charity Cup and 2–1 by Chelsea in the final of the London Challenge Cup. Both finals were played on the winning side's home ground.

The original trophy was donated by the Rt. Hon. Reginald Harrison. The competition was discontinued in 1975.

List of Finals

Notes

See also 
 London Football Association
 London Senior Cup
 London Challenge Cup

References

External links
 The Official Website of the London Football Association

County Cup competitions
Football competitions in London
Defunct football cup competitions in England
Recurring sporting events disestablished in 1975
1975 disestablishments in England